Kirkcaldy (Scottish Gaelic: Dùn Phàrlain, Scots: Dunfaurlin) was a local government district in the Fife region of Scotland from 1975 to 1996, lying a short distance to the south of the regional capital Glenrothes which lay within the district.

Local government 
As its name suggests, the district (one of three in the Fife region, along with Dunfermline and North-East Fife) was centred around the town of Kirkcaldy, an important royal burgh in the historic county of Fife, although its boundaries extended some way beyond the town. In the Local Government (Scotland) Act 1973 leading to its creation, the district's desired composition was described as:

Outwith Kirkcaldy, the district encompassed the Levenmouth conurbation, coastal villages such as Burntisland, mining communities including Cardenden, and the expanding new town of Glenrothes which was chosen as the regional capital for Fife and had its own Development Corporation, but was required to seek agreement with the District Council at Kirkcaldy (essentially the rival town) for matters at local level, a situation which frequently caused tensions between the administrations. It had the sixth-largest population of the 53 districts of the era. Other than its two Fife neighbours to the north and south and the North Sea to the east, Kirkcaldy had a short western border with Perth and Kinross district in the Tayside region.

The Local Government etc. (Scotland) Act 1994 abolished all of the districts and regions. Fife was retained as a single unitary council area, headquartered in Glenrothes as the regional council had also been. Similar boundaries as those of Kirkcaldy district have since been re-used as 'Mid Fife' or 'Central Fife' for some purposes such as local economic planning and policing, although Glenrothes and Kirkcaldy are often split into separate controlling entities owing to their size, with settlements further west around Cowdenbeath incorporated to increase the populations if required, as in the Scottish Parliamentary constituencies.

See also 
 1992 Kirkcaldy District Council election
 Subdivisions of Scotland

References

Districts of Scotland
Kirkcaldy
Glenrothes
Levenmouth
Politics of Fife
1975 establishments in Scotland
1996 disestablishments in Scotland